Charles J. Perrenot (August 22, 1859 - January 18, 1898) was a politician in Florida. He served as president of the Florida Senate.

Perrenot was born August 22, 1859 in Milton, Florida. The family was French. Perrenot had family member in Texas who were involved in politics. He studied law in the office of George G. McWhorter, and in 1882 was admitted to the bar, then starting up his own practice in Milton.

Perrenot was listed as a state senator representing district 1 in Santa Rosa County, Florida in 1893. He was elected Senate President in 1897. Ernest Amos was a law clerk for him.

In 1898 a lawyer Charles J. Perrenot was reported recently deceased in Milton, Florida.

References

Presidents of the Florida Senate
1859 births
1898 deaths
Florida lawyers
19th-century American lawyers
19th-century American politicians
American people of French descent
People from Milton, Florida